East West is the fifth album by English musician Julia Fordham, released in 1997. It was Fordham's final studio album for Virgin Records.

Production
The album was produced by Michael Brook. Members of Jackson Browne's band served as backing musicians.

Judith Owen played piano on "More Than I Can Bear". James Fearnley played accordion on "I Can Tell You Anything".

Critical reception

The Washington Post wrote that most of the musical settings "not only subtly highlight the sheer beauty of Fordham's voice, they quietly dramatize the emotional yearning and vulnerability that shapes the album's songs." The Knoxville News Sentinel declared that "Fordham's rich voice is a marvel ... She conveys a cool British demeanor, but she is affecting and genuine."

The New York Times thought that "amid all the talk about 'girl power' resounding in the media, some grown women continue to make lovely, complicated pop music about the ambiguities of maturity." The Dallas Morning News stated that Fordham's "smoldering soprano and confessional songs simmer in a soulful stew." The Houston Press concluded that "with its tempo locked at a moderate swing and lots of innocuous strumming throughout, it quickly becomes stale."

AllMusic wrote that "Fordham possesses a gorgeous, dusky voice that is reminiscent of Joni Mitchell and Alison Moyet."

Track listing
All tracks written by Julia Fordham, except where noted.

Personnel
Adapted from the album's liner notes.

Musicians
Julia Fordham – lead vocals, background vocals, acoustic guitars, keyboards
Michael Brook – Infinite Guitar, guitars, keyboards
Lenny Castro – percussion, shaker
David Clifton – electric guitars, acoustic guitars
James Fearnley – accordion
Mauricio Lewak – drums
Jason Lewis – percussion
Kevin McCormick – bass guitar
Paul PJ Moore – keyboards
Judith Owen – piano
Martin Tillman – cello
Jeff Young – piano, keyboards, Wurlitzer

Production
Produced and arranged by Michael Brook and Julia Fordham
Recorded and mixed by Jeff DeMorris, except tracks 2 and 3 recorded by Michael Brook, mixed by Michael Brook and Julia Fordham; track 5 recorded by Jeff DeMorris, Bill Jackson and Michael Brook, mixed by Bill Jackson, Michael Brook and Julia Fordham; track 6 recorded by Julie Last, mixed by Bill Jackson
Programming by Michael Brook
Recorded at Ocean Way, Los Angeles, except for tracks 2 and 3 recorded at Hybrid, San Francisco; track 5 recorded at Ocean Way, Los Angeles and Hybrid, San Francisco
Mastered by Doug Sax at The Mastering Lab, Los Angeles
Art direction by Robbie Cavolina and Julia Fordham
Photography by Lisa Peardon

References

External links
East West at Discogs

Julia Fordham albums
1997 albums
Virgin Records albums